Constance (Breton: Konstanza; c. 1161c. 5 September 1201) was Duchess of Brittany from 1166 to her death in 1201 and Countess of Richmond from 1171 to 1201. Constance was the daughter of Duke Conan IV by his wife, Margaret of Huntingdon, a sister of the Scottish kings Malcolm IV and William I.

Life and reign

Constance's father Conan IV had reunited the Duchy of Brittany in wars with Henry II of England. After the wars with Henry II, Conan IV faced rebellions from some Breton nobles. He appealed to Henry II for assistance in putting down those rebellions.

In 1166, Henry invaded Brittany in order to punish the local barons' revolt. In order to gain complete control over the duchy, he forced Conan IV into abdicating in Constance's favor and betrothing her to his fourth legitimate son Geoffrey. Five-year-old Constance succeeded him as Duchess of Brittany.

She spent her youth at the English court.

In February 1171, Conan IV died. Although his daughter Constance was the heiress of the Earldom of Richmond, she did not enter her inheritance until 1183/1184.

In 1181, twenty-year-old Constance was forced into marriage with Geoffrey. On 19 August 1186 Geoffrey was trampled to death in a riding accident during a tournament in Paris. Constance thereafter became the effective ruler of Brittany.

However, on 3 February 1188, Henry II of England arranged for Constance to marry Ranulf de Blondeville, 6th Earl of Chester, one of the most powerful earls in England. Though Ranulf called himself, not consistently, duke of Brittany, he never had the control of the duchy, and is not known to have played an important role there, and the Bretons, as well as Constance, never acknowledged him as duke, and excluded him from the government of the duchy.

After King Richard I ascended the English throne, he strengthened his intervention in Brittany. Maintaining custody of Geoffrey's and Constance's daughter, Eleanor, might have been a condition for him to allow Constance to continue ruling. In 1190, Constance appeared at Richard's court at Tours.

In 1191, Richard officially proclaimed his nephew, Constance's son, Arthur, as his heir in a treaty signed with Philip II of France.

To promote her son Arthur's position and inheritance, Constance included him in the government of the duchy in 1196. In response to this act that thwarted his projects, Richard summoned her to Bayeux and had her abducted by Ranulf in Pontorson and imprisoned in Saint-James de Beuvron. He spread the rumour that Constance had been imprisoned for matrimonial reasons. As a result, rebellions were sparked across Brittany on her behalf and Arthur was sent to Brest. Richard demanded that hostages were delivered to him in exchange for Constance's freedom. The Bretons agreed but Constance and the hostages remained imprisoned and rebellions went on. Richard eventually bowed to growing pressure and had the Duchess released in 1198. Back in Brittany, Constance had her marriage annulled.

On 1 June 1199, Pope Innocent III eventually decided that the Archbishopric of Dol should be subordinated to the Metropolitan of Tours and deprived the archbishop of his title and pallium. The archbishopric then became a bishopric again. Constance disagreed with this decision, which gave an advantage to Philip Augustus over Brittany, and was consequently excommunicated.

Constance took Guy of Thouars as her next husband in September or October 1199.

Between 1198 and the time of her death due to complications from delivering twin daughters, Constance ruled with her son Arthur as co-ruler.  Throughout these years, Constance advised her son towards a French alliance, pursuing the policy of her late husband Geoffrey II. 

At her request Eleanor was released from royal custody and united with her and Arthur in France.

Family

As a girl, Constance could not inherit the duchy at her father's death if she had a brother. A charter by Margaret, Constance's mother, seems to show that she and Conan had more than one child. However, two charters made by Constance and her son Arthur towards 1200 mention a brother of Constance, William "clericus". As a boy, William should logically have inherited the duchy after Conan. According to Everard, Henry II's forcing Constance's father into abdicating in 1166 was meant to prevent any son of the Duke from inheriting the duchy.

Constance and Geoffrey had three children:
Eleanor, Fair Maid of Brittany (1182/1184-1241)
 Matilda (c. 1185-bef 1189)
Arthur I, Duke of Brittany (1187-1203) - Geoffrey's posthumous son

Constance and Guy had two daughters: 
 Alix of Thouars (12001221); she married Peter Mauclerc, the first Breton ruler of the House of Dreux; and 
 Catherine of Thouars (1201c. 1240), Dame of Vitre; she married Andrew III, Baron of Vitré, son of Andrew II, Baron of Vitré and Eustacie of Rays; her husband was noteworthy for rebuilding the Château de Vitré

Several sources indicate that Constance might have had a third daughter by Guy:
 Margaret of Thouars (12011216/1220); she was the first wife of Geoffrey, Viscount of Rohan

Death and Burial
Constance died, age 40, on 5 September 1201 at Nantes. She was buried at Villeneuve Abbey near Nantes, which she had founded earlier that year.

Constance's cause of death is debated. The Chronique de Tours indicated that she died of leprosy but this statement is doubtful. It is also believed that she died from complications of childbirth, shortly after delivering twin daughters.

Portrayals

In literature 
Constance of Brittany appears in several literary works, including:
 The Troublesome Reign of King John (c.1589) anonymous tragedy
 King John (1593-1596) tragedy by William Shakespeare
 Jean sans Terre ou la mort d’Arthur (1791) by Jean-François Ducis
 King John (1800) by Richard Valpy
 La Mort d’Arthur de Bretagne (1826) poem by Alexis Fossé
 Prince of Darkness (2005), Devil's Brood (2008), Lionheart (2011) and A King's Ransom (2014) novels by Sharon Kay Penman

Constance is also mentioned in the poem Le petit Arthur de Bretagne à la tour de Rouen (1822) by Marceline Desbordes-Valmore, the drama Arthur de Bretagne (1885) by Louis Tiercelin and the novels Le Loup blanc (1843) by Paul Féval, Le Poids d’une couronne (légende bretonne) (1867-1868) by Gabrielle d’Étampes, the second volume of the trilogy Le Château des Poulfenc (2009) by Brigitte Coppin and, along with her daughters Matilda, Alix and Catherine and her third husband Guy of Thouars in the novel Dans l’Ombre du Passé (2020) by Léa Chaillou.

In theatre and television 
Constance is a character in the play King John by William Shakespeare, in which she has several very eloquent speeches on grief and death. On screen, she has been portrayed by Julia Neilson in the silent short King John (1899), which recreates John's death scene at the end of the play, Sonia Dresdel in the BBC Sunday Night Theatre version (1952), and Claire Bloom in the BBC Shakespeare version (1984). In the ITC series The Adventures of Robin Hood, she appeared in five episodes variously played by Dorothy Alison (series 1 and 2), Pamela Alan (series 3) and Patricia Marmont (series 4). She was also played by Paula Williams (as a girl) and Nina Francis (as an adult) in the BBC TV drama series The Devil's Crown (1978).

See also

Dukes of Brittany family tree

Notes

References

|-

1160s births
1201 deaths
12th-century dukes of Brittany
13th-century dukes of Brittany
12th-century Breton women
13th-century Breton women
12th-century women rulers
13th-century women rulers
12th-century English nobility
13th-century English nobility
12th-century English women
13th-century English women
Duchesses of Brittany
Earls of Richmond (1136 creation)
Richmond, Constance, Countess of
Deaths_in_childbirth
Dukes of Brittany
French people of Scottish descent